The 2021 Los Angeles FC season was the club's fourth season in Major League Soccer, the top tier of the American soccer pyramid. LAFC played its home matches at the Banc of California Stadium in the Exposition Park neighborhood of Los Angeles, California.

Squad

First-team roster

Coaching staff

Transfers

Transfers in

Transfers out

Draft picks

Competitions

Preseason friendlies

MLS

Standings

Western Conference

Overall

Matches

All matches are in Pacific time

U.S. Open Cup

Statistics

References

Los Angeles FC
Los Angeles FC
Los Angeles FC
Los Angeles FC
Los Angeles FC seasons